Raymundo Carvalho dos Santos (born 23 August 1923) is a Brazilian former basketball player who competed in the 1952 Summer Olympics.

References

External links

1923 births
Possibly living people
Brazilian men's basketball players
Olympic basketball players of Brazil
Basketball players at the 1952 Summer Olympics